Nabil Kassel (born March 10, 1984) is an Algerian boxer best known to win the middleweight gold at the 2007 All-Africa Games. The family name is Kassel, Algerians generally write this first (Kassel Nabil).

Career
Kassel participated at the Olympics 2004 at the age of 19 but lost to southpaw Andre Dirrell by RSC-2. He qualified for the Athens Games by winning the gold medal at the 2nd AIBA African 2004 Olympic Qualifying Tournament in Gaborone, Botswana. In the final he defeated Tunisia's Mohamed Sahraoui.

He won the 2005 African Championships, and was a member of the team that competed for Africa at the 2005 Boxing World Cup in Moscow, Russia.
.

At the Arab Championships 2007 he lost to Mohammed Hikal.

At the All-African Games he beat Hikal 17:15 in the first round and won.

He later qualified for the Olympics. At the qualifier he lost again to veteran Hikal but beat Daniel Shishia for the third spot. At the Olympics he lost to Darren Sutherland.

External links
yahoo data
2005 African Championships
Africa Games 2007
Qualifier 2008

1984 births
Living people
Middleweight boxers
Boxers at the 2004 Summer Olympics
Boxers at the 2008 Summer Olympics
Olympic boxers of Algeria
Algerian male boxers
African Games gold medalists for Algeria
African Games medalists in boxing
Competitors at the 2003 All-Africa Games
Competitors at the 2007 All-Africa Games
21st-century Algerian people